An air-line railroad was a railroad that was relatively straight, following a shorter (and thus, presumably quicker) route instead of a longer, winding route. In their heyday, which was prior to aviation, they were often referred to simply as "air lines". For example, a 1903 novel indicates a character's success by noting his position as "superintendent of passenger traffic of the New York and Chicago Air Line", a fictitious railroad.

Dictionary definition
Webster's 1913 dictionary gives the definition "Air line, a straight line; a bee line. Hence Air-line, adj.; as, air-line road."

Usually a railroad is built curving alongside a river, to avoid hill slopes.

Public reaction
Air line railroads began to be built in the mid-nineteenth century. As early as 1853, the New York Daily Times ran a satirical article mocking the trend, suggesting that the fad for an "air line" name was being used to float dubious investments:
The "air-line" is three miles and nine-thirteenths shorter from Quattlebum to Squashtown than the present traveled  route by the Conger Creek railroad.... Though we know there is already a railroad in operation between Quattlebum and Squash Town, parallel with and not far from our air-line... we feel satisfied that the immense current of travel, now passing by Conger Creek, must be changed, in the twinkling of an eye, to the air-line road. What sane individual, starting at Quattlebum and bound for Squash, will take the Conger Creek road when he can go by way of Shootsburg in two minutes less time, and at very little more cost?

When actual air travel began in the United States, the older usage of the phrase "air line" led to confusion. During a spate of interest in aviation shares on Wall Street following Charles A. Lindbergh's trans-Atlantic flight in 1927, Seaboard Air Line shares actually attracted some investor curiosity because of the name's aviation-related connotations; only after noticing that Seaboard Air Line was actually a railroad did investors lose interest.

List of air line railroads
Seaboard Air Line Railroad (before 1946 called the Seaboard Air Line Railway, 'SAL'), a major system in the U.S. South, now part of CSX
Air-Line Railroad (North Carolina), part of the Southern Railway
Air-Line Railroad (South Carolina), part of the Southern Railway
Air Line Railroad (Texas), incorporated 1850, predecessor of the Southern Pacific Company
Atlanta and Birmingham Air Line Railway, part of the Seaboard Air Line Railroad
Atlanta and Charlotte Air-Line Railway, part of the Southern Railway
Atlanta and Richmond Air-Line Railway, part of the Southern Railway
Auburn and Deposit Air Line Railroad in New York (never built)
Baraboo Air Line Railroad, part of the Chicago and North Western Railway
Birmingham and Atlanta Air-Line Railroad, part of the Seaboard Air Line Railroad
Boston and New York Air-Line Railroad, part of the New York, New Haven and Hartford Railroad
Canada Air-Line Railway, part of the Grand Trunk Railway
Chicago and Indiana Air Line Railway, part of the South Shore Line
Chicago and Indianapolis Air-Line Railroad, part of the Chicago, Indianapolis and Louisville Railroad
Chicago-New York Electric Air Line Railroad. Less than 50 km (30 miles) was built and is still used as an interurban eastwards from Chicago, Illinois
Chicago and Northern Pacific Air-Line Railroad and Chicago and Northern Pacific Air-Line Railway, part of the Chicago and North Western Railway
Cincinnati and Chicago Air-Line Railroad, part of the Pennsylvania Railroad
Clinton Air Line Railroad, 1850s proposed railroad, graded but never laid with tracks, would have run from Hudson, OH to Tiffin, OH
Dixon Air Line Railroad, part of the Chicago and North Western Railway
Eastern and Western Air Line Railway, defunct narrow gauge road in northwest Ohio
Elberton Air Line Railroad, part of the Southern Railway
Eufaula and St. Andrews Bay Air-line Railroad in Florida (never built)
Fargo and St. Louis Air Line Railway, part of the Chicago, Milwaukee, St. Paul and Pacific Railroad
Georgia Air Line Railroad, part of the Southern Railway
Kansas City and Independence Air Line Railroad, part of the Kansas City Southern Railway
Le Roy and Caney Valley Air Line Railway, part of the Missouri Pacific Railroad
Long Island Railroad, formerly a subsidiary of the Pennsylvania Railroad; especially the Ronkonkoma and Babylon Branches; track routes established before the suburban development of Long Island
Louisville, New Albany and St. Louis Air-Line Railway, part of the Southern Railway
Macon and Florida Air Line Railroad, part of the Southern Railway
Michigan Air-Line Railroad and Michigan Air-Line Railway, part of the New York Central Railroad and Grand Trunk Railway
Milltown Air Line Railway, a logging railroad in Georgia
Montreal and Boston Air Line, a marketing name used by the Boston and Lowell Railroad
National Air Line Railroad
New Albany and St. Louis Air Line Railway, part of the Southern Railway
New York and Boston Air Line Railroad, part of the New York, New Haven and Hartford Railroad, via Middletown and Willimantic
New York and Connecticut Air Line Railroad (never built)
New York and Pittsburgh Air Line Railroad
New York and Washington Air Line Railway (never built)
Niagara River and New York Air Line Railroad in New York (never built)
Northern Air-Line Railroad in New York (never built)
Northern Nebraska Air Line Railroad, part of the Chicago and North Western Railway
Pennsylvania Railroad along New Jersey section of the Northeast Corridor 
Piedmont Air-Line Railway, part of the Southern Railway
Quebec and Boston Air Line Railway (never built)
Raleigh and Augusta Air-Line Railroad, part of the Seaboard Air Line Railroad
Richmond and Washington Air Line Railroad (never built)
Salamanca Air Line Railroad in New York
Santa Monica Air Line in Los Angeles County
Seaboard Air Line Belt Railroad (Atlanta, Georgia), part of the Seaboard Air Line Railroad
Seaboard Inland Air Line Railroad, a predecessor of the SAL
Southern New England Railway, Never completed.
St. Charles Air Line Railroad in Chicago, Illinois
St. Clair and Chicago Air Line Railroad, part of the Grand Trunk Railway
St. Louis, Oklahoma and Texas Air-Line Railroad, part of the Chicago, Rock Island and Pacific Railroad
Stillmore Air Line Railway, part of the Central of Georgia Railway
Utica and Syracuse Air Line Railway in New York (never built)
Virginia Air Line Railway, part of the Chesapeake and Ohio Railroad (defunct)
Waycross Air Line Railroad, part of the Atlantic Coast Line Railroad

References

Rail infrastructure